Arakynthos (Greek: Αράκυνθος) is a former municipality in Aetolia-Acarnania, West Greece, Greece. Since the 2011 local government reform it is part of the municipality Agrinio, of which it is a municipal unit. The municipal unit has an area of 99.717 km2. It consists of the villages of Ano Kerasovo, Kato Kerasovo, Zevgaraki, Papadates (seat of the former municipality), Mataranga and Grammatikou.

References

Populated places in Aetolia-Acarnania